The Liberal Party was a Belgian political party that existed from 1846 until 1961, when it became the Party for Freedom and Progress, Partij voor Vrijheid en Vooruitgang/Parti de la Liberté et du Progrès or PVV-PLP, under the leadership of Omer Vanaudenhove.

History
The Liberal Party was founded in 1846 and as such was the first political party of Belgium. Walthère Frère-Orban wrote the first charter for the new party.

The Liberal Party had a clear victory in the 1848 elections, following lower tax requirements that benefited urban populations, where liberals were stronger. The Liberal Party remained in dominant position for the most part of the period from 1848 until 1884, where it lost to Catholics due to the First School War. The Liberal Party suffered even more losses in the next elections, most notable in the 1894 elections, the first ones with universal suffrage. However, they made a comeback in 1900 upon the introduction of proportional representation.

From 1887 until 1900, the Progressive Party (French: Parti Progressiste, Dutch: Progressieve Partij) existed as a separate progressive Liberal party.

Presidents
 1920 - 1921 : Albert Mechelynck
 1924 - 1926 : Edouard Pécher
 1927 - 1933 : Albert Devèze
 1933 - 1934 : Octave Dierckx
 1935 - 1936 : Léon Dens
 1936 - 1937 : Victor de Laveleye
 1937 - 1940 : Emile Coulonvaux
 1940 - 1945 : Jane Brigode and Fernand Demets (co-presidency) 
 1945 - 1953 : Roger Motz
 1953 - 1954 : Henri Liebaert
 1954 - 1958 : Maurice Destenay
 1958 - 1961 : Roger Motz
 1961 : Omer Vanaudenhove

Notable members

Jules Bara
Gustave Boël (1837-1912), industrialist
François Bailleux first party secretary
Charles Buls, mayor of Brussels (1881-1899)
Jacques Coghen, (1791-1858), second Minister of Finance of Belgium
Eugène Defacqz
François-Philippe de Haussy, (1789-1869), first governor of the National Bank of Belgium
Constant de Kerchove de Denterghem
Louis Franck (1868–1937), a leading Flemish liberal politician.
Walthère Frère-Orban, (1812–1896), wrote the first charter of the liberal party.
Charles Graux
Julius Hoste Jr. (1884–1954), businessman and leading Flemish liberal politician.
Paul Hymans, first President of the League of Nations
Paul Janson
Paul-Émile Janson
Joseph Lebeau
Albert Lilar
Adolphe Max, mayor of Brussels (1909-1939)
Eudore Pirmez
Eugène Prévinaire, (1805-1877), second governor of the National Bank of Belgium.
Jean Rey (1902-1983), President of the European Commission 
Charles Rogier
Gustave Rolin-Jaequemyns
Ernest Solvay (1838-1922), chemist, industrialist and philanthropist.
Patrice Lumumba 
Henri Story (1897-1944) 
Herman Teirlinck (1879–1967), a famous Belgian writer.
Pierre Van Humbeeck
Jan Van Rijswijck
Pierre-Théodore Verhaegen, founder of the Université Libre de Bruxelles
Raoul Warocqué

See also
 Politics of Belgium
 Liberal Archive
 Liberalism in Belgium
 Progressive Party

References

Sources
 Liberal Archive
 Th. Luykx, M. Platel, Politieke geschiedenis van België, 2 vol., Kluwer, 1985
 E. Witte, J. Craeybeckx, A. Meynen, Politieke geschiedenis van België, Standaard, 1997

Classical liberal parties
Liberal parties in Belgium
Radical parties
Defunct political parties in Belgium
Political parties established in 1846
1846 establishments in Belgium